Hystrix paukensis is an extinct Old World porcupine which existed during the late Miocene-early Pliocene in what is now Myanmar. It was described by Nishioka, et al. in 2011. The species epithet refers to Pauk Township, the type locality of the species.

References

Hystricidae
Fossil taxa described in 2011
Miocene rodents
Pliocene rodents
Cenozoic mammals of Asia
Fossils of Myanmar